Our Lady, Queen of Heaven Church is a Roman Catholic church in Oreana, Idaho. The church's building was built c. 1883, originally to house Oreana's general store and post office.  It was renovated in 1961 as a church.

Description
When the building was constructed, it was part of a corner which included Oreana's saloon, hotel, and school; the general store building is the only surviving structure from this set. The lava rock building features a false front and a wooden cornice atop its parapet roofline. In addition to serving as a general store, the building also house Oreana's first post office, which opened in 1885. In 1961, the building was renovated to become a Catholic church; the renovation project added a number of Gothic features but left the building's overall design intact.

The building was added to the National Register of Historic Places on November 28, 1980.

References

External links
  St. Paul's Catholic Church and School for expanded history

Churches on the National Register of Historic Places in Idaho
Roman Catholic churches completed in 1883
Buildings and structures in Owyhee County, Idaho
Churches in the Roman Catholic Diocese of Boise
Commercial buildings completed in 1883
National Register of Historic Places in Owyhee County, Idaho
19th-century Roman Catholic church buildings in the United States